Topher Campbell is a filmmaker, artist and writer who has created a range of works in broadcasting, film, theatre, television and performance. His works focus on issues of sexuality, masculinity, and the city, particularly in relation to race, human rights and climate change. Campbell is a Fellow of the Royal Society of Arts, and a past recipient of the Jerwood Directors Award (2005). He holds an honorary doctorate from the University of Sussex for his work in the arts and Black LGBTQ advocacy. He is currently Programme Director of the Collaborative Theatre Making programme at Rose Bruford College in London.

Early life 
Campbell was born in Coventry, England, to a Jamaican mother and a man he did not know. Campbell has referred to his parents' relationship as "a love affair between his mother and a handsome stranger". His mother abandoned Campbell at the age of one and he would not reunite with her until he was 13 years old. He was raised in foster care in Birmingham. As an adolescent, he participated in the "club kid" scene in London, Paris and New York City, and also worked as a model.

He was the first member of his family to go to University, attending the University of Sussex and graduating with a bachelor’s degree in intellectual history. In 2017, he was awarded an Honorary Doctorate by the University of Sussex for his work; it is the first Honorary Doctorate to be given to an openly gay Black man in the UK.

Campbell has described himself as "acutely shy throughout [his] 20’s and into [his] 30's", which caused him to learn to establish himself as "commanding decisive and clear" in "professional settings".

Career 
As an actor he has starred in Isaac Julien's Trussed, Campbell X's Stud Life, and Ian Poitier's Oh Happy Day. He is a former artistic director of The Red Room Theatre Company and past chair of the Independent Theatre Council UK. In 2000, he co-founded rukus! Federation a Black LGBTQ Charity. In 2017, he was longlisted for the Spread the Word's inaugural Life Writing Prize for his forthcoming memoir Battyman. He is a patron of Switchboard.

Film 
His films have appeared in festivals worldwide. At the age of 24, he participated in the Regional Theatre Young Directors Training Scheme, which led to his first film, The Homecoming (1995). Created with artist/photographer Ajamu X through the Black Arts Video Project,:282 The Homecoming is a meditation on Black masculinity and sexuality, themes Campbell has continued to explore throughout his work.

Fetish (2018) 
In 2018, he created FETISH, a piece inspired by the works of Jean-Michel Basquiat. In FETISH, Campbell walks naked through the streets of New York City. He described the process that led to the creation of the film:FETISH came about because I wanted to express more complex, nuanced and creative notions of my space in the world whilst also honouring the fallen. It’s a film that I willed into being as a place for me to reflect on all the different masculinities and femininities inside of me and to offer a vision of humanity and humanness; amongst all the violence and degradation.The work reflected the challenges of walking through the city, and generally navigating space as a Black person. He considered the work a dual journey, a protest on the streets of Manhattan, as well as an artistic journey for the audience viewing the film. It was created in collaboration with 2014 Mercury Music Prize winners Young Fathers.

rukus! Federation 
In June 2000, he and Ajamu X co-founded rukus! Federation, a Black Queer arts charity dedicated to presenting the best in work by Black Lesbian, Gay, Bisexual, Transgender and Queer (BLGBTQ) artists.:277; The name, which "is a derivative of the word 'raucous and also draws on the name "Rukus [ . . . ] a well-known African-American porn star" was chosen in order to "present [the artists'] politics more playfully".:277

In 2005 the rukus! archive project was launched.  Originally, they "wanted to call it the Black, Lesbian, and Gay Queer Archive" but the Charity Commission "objected to the word queer, because some people might find it offensive" and the name was changed. Housed at the London Metropolitan Archives, Campbell and Ajamu X founded the archive to collect, preserve, exhibit, and otherwise make available for the first time to the public historical, cultural, and artistic materials related to the Black lesbian, gay, bisexual, and transgender communities in the United Kingdom.It is the UK's first and only archive dedicated to Black LGBTQ artists. In 2008 it received the London Metropolitan Archives' Archive Landmark Award. rukus!archive projects include the play Mangina Monologues.

Influences 
Cambell has cited Derek Jarman and Isaac Julien as important influences on his work.:282 He has also drawn on academic thinking "around Black mainstream  identity politics around hybridity, and notions of difference and diversity, as defined by Black artists", for example, Sonia Boyce.:282 He has also cited the influence of works by sci-fi authors such as Samuel R. Delany, Octavia Butler and Sheree Thomas.

Radio 
Talking Huck Finn (2001) – BBC Radio 4
Facing Leicester Square (2002) BBC Radio 3

Plays 
Blood Knot (Derby Playhouse) (1990)
Woza Albert (1991)
Necklaces (Talawa Theatre Company) (1992)
Flamingo Theatre London (1992)
Moor Masterpieces (West Yorkshire Playhouse) (1996)
Wicked Games – (West Yorkshire Playhouse) (1996)
Good Copy – (West Yorkshire Playhouse) (1996)
Jar the Floor – (West Yorkshire Playhouse) (1997)
Pantheaon of the Gods – (Young Vic Theatre) (2001)
Dead Funny – (Nottingham Playhouse) (2001)
Unstated (2008)
Oikos (2010)
Protozoa (2010)

Filmography

As director

As actor

As writer 
For Coloured Boys 
Black and Gay in the UK
On Freedom: Powerful Polemics by Supporters of Belarus Free Theatre
Brothas 2.0 part or Outlaws to Inlaws (Kings Head Theatre London)

As executive producer 
Oikos, a Journey in Wood (2010)

Awards 
Jerwood Directors Award (2005)
London Metropolitan Archives Award (2008)
Small Projects Award (2010)
Nominated for the Urban Intervention Award 2010
Nomination for the AKA Theatre Event of the Year Award

References

External links 
 The Guardian: Jelly Fish Theatre 
 The Guardian Profile: Topher Campbell
 The Telegraph: Topher Campbell on the Jellyfish Theatre
 The Guardian: Public Inquiry
 UK Black Pride: Topher Campbell
 The Red Room: Topher Campbell
 The BFI: Topher Campbell
 Merrifield, Nicola, "ITC names Topher Campbell as new chair", The Stage, 22 March 2016.

Black British cinema
Black British filmmakers
British film directors
British male screenwriters
British theatre directors
Living people
Place of birth missing (living people)
Year of birth missing (living people)